The Klečka killings were the mass murder of 22 Kosovo Serb civilians, including children, allegedly by members of the Kosovo Liberation Army (KLA) over a period of several days in July 1998, during the Kosovo War. After the killings, it was alleged that members of the KLA attempted to dispose of the massacre-victims by incinerating their remains in a lime kiln. The Yugoslav Ministry of Foreign Affairs condemned the killings as a "Nazi-style crime."

Klečka, a village located approximately 40 kilometers southwest of Pristina, was a significant logistics and training base for the Kosovo Liberation Army (KLA) in the summer of 1998. Serbian police took Klečka from the Kosovo Liberation Army on 27 August 1998 after heavy fighting. Afterwards, they quickly gave access to television crews and foreign correspondents, claiming that twenty-two Serb civilians had been killed in the village in the previous month. They alleged that after the killings occurred, members of the KLA attempted to dispose of the massacre-victims by incinerating their remains in a lime kiln.

The Yugoslav Ministry of Foreign Affairs accused the international community of double standards over the clashes which were occurring in Kosovo, and condemned the killings in Klečka as a "Nazi-style crime." A representative of the Kosovo Liberation Army denied that the organization had anything to do with the killings, stating that "the KLA has not killed a single Serb civilian."

Trials
Luan and Bekim Mazreku are two cousins, Kosovo Albanians, who joined the Kosovo Liberation Army (KLA) in the Kosovo War (1998–99) and allegedly committed atrocities against the Serb minority.

The two allegedly participated in the Klečka massacre. The KLA had kidnapped Serb civilians during their attack on Orahovac, some 43 taken from Orahovac, along with around 100 kidnapped from elsewhere, to Mališevo and then Klečka. There were some Serbian police officers among the kidnapped. Civilians were tortured and then executed, and their bodies incinerated in a lime kiln in order to dispose evidence.

Luan Mazreku testified that a KLA commander, himself, and other soldiers, raped a girl aged 10–11, in front of her parents. Soldiers raped women and girls of 8 years and upwards. He identified  as taking some aside and raping them in succession. Krasniqi ordered for massacre, took a woman and boy aged 8 to the side. Mazreku cut off his ear, Krasniqi cut out her eyes, cut off her hands and ears. The rest of the kidnapped were executed, shot at simultaneously by the soldiers until ammunition ran out. The cousins testified on ten civilians executed by firing squad, and three women who were raped.

They were indicted at the District Court of Pristina. They went on trial in Belgrade in September 2000. Bekim Mazreku claims that it was Fatmir Limaj who ordered the massacre, and that Limaj and other soldiers raped three girls. On 18 April 2001 the cousins were found guilty of terrorism and sentenced to twenty years of prison. The Humanitarian Law Center called it a biased court, testimony through forced extraction, and claimed that there were no evidence that the cousins had committed crimes. Evidence in the trial against Fatmir Limaj were dismissed in 2012 by the District Court of Pristina, made up of a council of two EULEX and one local judge.

See also
Kosovo War crimes witness intimidation and deaths

References

Sources

 
 

1998 in Kosovo
Mass murder in 1998
Massacres in the Kosovo War
Massacres of Serbs
Albanian war crimes in the Kosovo War
July 1998 events in Europe